W800, W 800 or W–800 may refer to:

 Sony Ericsson W800, a mobile phone
 Kawasaki W800, a motorbike